During the 1994–95 English football season, West Ham United F.C. competed in the FA Premier League.

Season summary
Before the season started, the West Ham board of directors heard speculation that assistant manager Harry Redknapp was about to be offered his old job as Bournemouth manager. They reacted by dismissing manager Billy Bonds and promoting Redknapp to the manager's seat. Redknapp then earned the instant admiration of the Upton Park faithful by signing Don Hutchison and re-signing striker Tony Cottee, who returned to the club after six years at Everton. Redknapp also strengthened the squad over the next months by bringing in Julian Dicks, Les Sealey and Stan Lazaridis.

The Hammers spent much of the season battling against relegation, but a good run of form during the final month pulled them up to a secure 14th-place finish.

Final league table

Results summary

Results by matchday

Results
West Ham United's score comes first

Legend

FA Premier League

FA Cup

League Cup

Squad
Squad at end of season

Left club during season

Reserve squad

Transfers

In

Out

Transfers in:  £5,000,000
Transfers out:  £1,870,000
Total spending:  £3,130,000

References

West Ham United F.C. seasons
West Ham United
West Ham United
West Ham United